Shyu is the Gwoyeu Romatzyh romanization of the Chinese surname Xú. People with this surname include:

 Heidi Shyu (born 1953), American engineer and Department of Defense official
 Shyu Jong-shyong (born 1957), Taiwanese politician, Deputy Secretary-General of the Executive Yuan
 Shyu Jyuo-min, Taiwanese engineer and politician, Minister of Science and Technology
 Jen Shyu (born 1978), American jazz musician